is a four-member Japanese pop and hip hop group that incorporates singing and rapping into their music. They have had several major hits in Japan, including "Sakura", which reached number two on the Oricon yearly chart for 2005 and was featured in the Japanese game Taiko no Tatsujin and the anime Eureka Seven. Ketsumeishi is a Japanese word for a type of medical herbs made from the seeds of Senna obtusifolia, which is often used in Chinese medicine.

Members 
 : Vocalist
 : Vocalist
 : Vocalist
 : DJ

Discography

Albums

Singles

References

External links 
 Official site

Japanese pop music groups
Avex Group artists
Toy's Factory artists
1993 establishments in Japan
Musical groups established in 1993
Musical groups from Tokyo